The 2006 Dutch National Track Championships were the Dutch national Championship for track cycling. The competitions took place at Sportpaleis Alkmaar in Alkmaar, the Netherlands from December 28 to December 30. Competitions were held of various track cycling disciplines in different age, gender and disability categories.

Medal summary

Elite

References

 
Dutch National track cycling championships
Dutch National Track Championships
Track cycling
Cycling in Alkmaar